The Santuit River, also known as the Cotuit River, is a  river on the border between Mashpee and Cotuit, Massachusetts on Cape Cod.

The river flows southwards from the southern end of Santuit Pond into Popponesset Bay (also known as Shoestring Bay) on the south shore of Cape Cod.

The river was a vigorous herring/alewife run and has been reputed to hold sea-run brown trout. It was alleged that overpumping by an adjacent golf course caused the river to run dry in the early 1990s but that charge was denied.

References 

 Popponesset Bay: Results Pilots Modeling Scenarios

Rivers of Barnstable County, Massachusetts
Rivers of Massachusetts